Jared Lamar Harper (born September 14, 1997) is an American professional basketball player for Valencia of the Spanish Liga ACB and the EuroLeague. He played college basketball for the Auburn Tigers where he was the starting point guard on the Tigers first ever Final Four team.

Early life
Harper began playing basketball with a Nerf hoop in his dining room. He also played baseball and the saxophone during his childhood. In basketball, Harper usually faced older opponents despite being undersized. He often trained with his younger brother Jalen under the guidance of his father Patrick Harper, former point guard for Elizabeth City State University in North Carolina.

High school career
Harper played basketball for Pebblebrook High School in Mableton, Georgia. As a junior in 2014–15, Harper averaged 21 points and seven assists per game and led Pebblebrook to a school-best 27–6 record. Pebblebrook finished the season as Georgia Class 6A runners-up after losing to Joseph Wheeler High School, a team featuring top recruit Jaylen Brown, in the state title game. In July 2015, Harper was named co-most valuable player (MVP) of the Nike Elite Youth Basketball League (EYBL) Peach Jam, scoring a 33 points and eight assists to help the Georgia Stars win the championship. In his senior season with Pebblebrook, he averaged 27 points, 10.1 assists, 5.7 rebounds and 3.7 steals, guiding his team to a 23–10 record and another Class 6A state championship appearance. Harper left high school as a two-time first-team All-State selection. He was a consensus four-star recruit in the 2016 class and committed to Auburn on March 19, 2015. His other NCAA Division I offers included Kansas State and Ole Miss.

College career
Harper averaged 11.4 points, 3.0 assists, and 1.2 steals per game, starting 30 games for Auburn in his freshman season. On January 7, 2017, he scored a season-high 24 points, including 16 of Auburn's final 19 points, in an 88–85 loss to Ole Miss. Harper was named SEC Freshman of the Week twice during the season. In 2017–18, through 34 games as a sophomore, he averaged 13.2 points, 5.4 assists, and 1.2 steals per game. On February 3, 2018, Harper posted a double-double of 14 points and 14 assists in a 93–81 win over Vanderbilt. He was one assist away from matching the school record for assists in a game, set by Eddie Johnson in 1976. One week later, Harper tied his scoring career-high, contributing 24 points and seven assists in a 78–61 victory over Georgia. He was a second-team All-SEC selection by the Associated Press and conference coaches.

Harper made his junior season debut on November 6, 2018 by recording his second career double-double, with 20 points and 13 assists, in a 101–58 win over South Alabama. On December 15, 2018, he scored a career-best 31 points in a 75–71 overtime win over UAB. At the end of the regular season, Harper earned second-team All-SEC honors from the Associated Press and conference coaches. In the NCAA tournament, Harper helped to lead the Tiger's to their first ever Final Four with a team high 26 points in the Tigers Elite Eight win against Kentucky.

Professional career

Phoenix Suns (2019–2020)
After his junior season concluded, Harper declared his entry into the 2019 NBA draft, forgoing his senior year at Auburn. However, he went undrafted by the end of the event. Harper later played for the Phoenix Suns during the 2019 NBA Summer League in Las Vegas. Following his performance in the Summer League, he signed a two-way contract with Phoenix. On October 23, 2019, Harper made his NBA debut coming off the bench in a 124–95 victory over the Sacramento Kings. On December 20, Harper recorded 25 points and dished out a career-high 13 assists in a 94–99 loss to the Fort Wayne Mad Ants. On January 18, 2020, Harper scored 31 points to go with seven assists, four rebounds and two steals in the G League for the Northern Arizona Suns in a 120–109 loss to the Sioux Falls Skyforce. On March 14, Harper was waived by Phoenix.

New York Knicks (2020–2021)
On June 25, 2020, the New York Knicks announced that they had claimed Harper off waivers. On November 25, Harper re-signed with the Knicks to a two-way contract with the Westchester Knicks. He appeared in four games with New York and 12 games with Westchester, averaging 21.3 points, 2.9 rebounds and a team-high 6.9 assists with the latter. On April 23, New York converted his two-way contract into a 10-day contract. However, ten days later, the Knicks signed him to another two-way contract.

New Orleans Pelicans / Birmingham Squadron (2021–2022)
On September 24, 2021, Harper signed with the New Orleans Pelicans. However, he was waived on October 9. On October 25, he signed with the Birmingham Squadron as an affiliate player. In 14 games, he averaged 21.3 points, 6.9 assists, and 2.9 rebounds in 32.7 minutes per game.

On December 21, 2021, Harper signed a two-way deal with the New Orleans Pelicans. However, he was waived on January 9, 2022 and was re-acquired by Birmingham three days later. On March 29, he signed a new two-way deal with the Pelicans. On April 9, Harper scored a career-high 12 points, alongside a career-high three steals, in a 114–141 loss to the Memphis Grizzlies. The next day, he logged a career-high nine assists, alongside ten points, in a 107–128 loss to the Golden State Warriors.

Valencia (2022–present)
On September 7, 2022, Harper signed with Valencia Basket of the Spanish Liga ACB and the EuroLeague.

Career statistics

NBA

Regular season

|-
| style="text-align:left;"|
| style="text-align:left;"|Phoenix
| 3 || 0 || 2.7 || .250 || .000 ||  || .0 || .0 || .0 || .0 || .7
|-
| style="text-align:left;"|
| style="text-align:left;"|New York
| 8 || 0 || 2.0 || .000 || .000 || .750 || .3 || .1 || .0 || .0 || .4
|-
| style="text-align:left;"|
| style="text-align:left;"|New Orleans
| 5 || 0 || 8.6 || .538 || .417 || 1.000 || .4 || 2.8 || .8 || .3 || 7.4
|- class:"sortbottom"
| style="text-align:center;" colspan="2"|Career
| 16 || 0 || 4.2 || .441 || .333 || .875 || .3 || .9 || .3 || .1 || 2.6

College

|-
| style="text-align:left;"|2016–17
| style="text-align:left;"|Auburn
| 32 || 30 || 24.2 || .385 || .344 || .705 || 1.9 || 3.0 || 1.2 || .1 || 11.4
|-
| style="text-align:left;"|2017–18
| style="text-align:left;"|Auburn
| 34 || 34 || 30.5 || .360 || .355 || .822 || 2.4 || 5.4 || 1.2 || .0 || 13.2
|-
| style="text-align:left;"|2018–19
| style="text-align:left;"|Auburn
| style="background:#cfecec;"|40* || style="background:#cfecec;"|40* || 33.0 || .399 || .370 || .828 || 2.5 || 5.8 || 1.1 || .1 || 15.3
|- class="sortbottom"
| style="text-align:center;" colspan="2"|Career
| 106 || 104 || 29.5 || .384 || .359 || .792 || 2.3 || 4.8 || 1.2 || .0 || 13.5

References

External links

 Auburn Tigers bio

1997 births
Living people
American men's basketball players
Auburn Tigers men's basketball players
Basketball players from Atlanta
Birmingham Squadron players
New Orleans Pelicans players
New York Knicks players
Northern Arizona Suns players
People from Mableton, Georgia
Phoenix Suns players
Point guards
Undrafted National Basketball Association players
United States men's national basketball team players
Westchester Knicks players